Søvik is a village in the municipality of Bjørnafjorden in Vestland county, Norway. The village lies at the eastern end of the Lysefjorden, a short distance south of the city of Bergen. The area is notable for the ancient ruins of the Lyse Abbey, located on the northeast side of the village.

Population

The village has been growing in recent years, and in 2013, Statistics Norway started included the neighboring village of Nordvik to the north in Bergen municipality as part of the "urban area" of Søvik. This has increased the size and area of Søvik, and it now is an urban area that spans two different municipalities. Of that total size, —with 385 residents—is in Bergen municipality and —with 1,237 residents—is in Bjørnafjorden municipality.

References

Villages in Vestland
Bjørnafjorden